A Man Who Liked Funerals (Čovjek koji je volio sprovode) is a 1989 Croatian film directed by Zoran Tadić, starring Ivica Vidović and Gordana Gadžić.

References

Further reading

External links
 

1989 films
Croatian crime drama films
1980s Croatian-language films
Yugoslav crime drama films
Croatian thriller films